Kateřina Valková (born 6 February 1996) is a Czech volleyball player, a member of the German club VfB 91 Suhl.

Sporting achievements

Clubs 
Czech Championship:
  2016, 2018

National Team 
European League:
  2018

References

External links

 Volleyball-Bundesliga profile
 SportFin profile
 Women.Volleybox profile
 
 
 
 

1996 births
Living people
Sportspeople from Plzeň
Czech women's volleyball players
Setters (volleyball)
Expatriate volleyball players in Germany
Czech expatriate sportspeople in Germany